The 2017 Mountain West Conference women's soccer tournament was the postseason women's soccer tournament for the Mountain West Conference held from October 31 through November 4, 2017. The five-match tournament took place at Peter Johann Memorial Soccer Field in Las Vegas, Nevada. The six-team single-elimination tournament consisted of three rounds based on seeding from regular season conference play. The UNLV Rebels were the defending champions, but will not defend their title after having failed to qualify for the 2017 tournament. The San Diego State Aztecs won the tournament with a 3–0 win over the New Mexico Lobos in the final.

Bracket

Schedule

Quarterfinals

Semifinals

Final

Statistics

Goalscorers

4 Goals
 Aliyah Utush – San Diego State

2 Goals
 Jessie Hix – New Mexico
 Raimee Sherle – Boise State

1 Goal
 Yaritza Arista – San Jose State
 Myra Delgadillo – Fresno State
 Julia Glaser – Fresno State
 Sabrina Miller – San Jose State
 Casey Murphy – New Mexico
 Eileen Zendejas – New Mexico

References

External links

Mountain West Conference Women's Soccer Tournament
2017 Mountain West Conference women's soccer season